David Fisher (born 24 February 1956) is a British lawn bowler. He competed for England in the open para-sport triples event at the 2014 Commonwealth Games where he won a bronze medal.

References

1956 births
Living people
Bowls players at the 2014 Commonwealth Games
Commonwealth Games bronze medallists for England
English male bowls players

Commonwealth Games medallists in lawn bowls
Medallists at the 2014 Commonwealth Games